War Devils, also known in Italy as I Diavoli Della Guerra, is a 1969 war / action film starring Guy Madison, Venantino Venantini, and Anthony Steel.

Plot
The action begins in Tunisia 1943. An allied commando unit commanded by Captain George Vincent (Guy Madison) parachutes into the Tunisia desert to carry out a dangerous mission behind German lines. Captain Vincent and a German officer (Venantino Venantini) must help each other in order to make it across the desert to safety.  After completing their trip, the German officer releases his American prisoner but pledges to kill him if they ever meet again.

One year later, the two officers find themselves facing each other again but this time in occupied France when Vincent and his US Rangers are sent to rescue a British officer, Colonel James Steele (Anthony Steel), an expert on secret arms and V2 rockets.

Notes

The film was released in colour and is rated PG.  It was included in a compilation of classic war films titled Combat Classics: 50 Movie Megapack, distributed by Mill Creek Entertainment in 2008.

References

External links

1969 films
Films set in Africa
Spanish war drama films
Italian war drama films
1960s war drama films
Films scored by Stelvio Cipriani
1969 drama films
Spanish World War II films
Macaroni Combat films
1960s English-language films
1960s Italian films